The third season of Airtel Super Singer Junior - Thamizhagathin Chellakuralukkana Thedal (the search for the sweet voice of Tamil Nadu) premiered on 17 October 2011 and 26 October 2012. The music competition reality TV show was again telecast on Vijay TV, and Bharti Airtel returned to sponsor the show. Episodes were telecast between Monday to Friday each week at 9:00pm. Children from the age of 6 years to the age of 14 years were permitted to audition to showcase their talent on Vijay TV's platform. Apart from gaining recognition from acclaimed names of the music industry and being a child singing icon, the show promised that its winner would be honored with a 3-bedroom Villa worth Rs.60 lakhs from its sponsor, Arun Excello Temple Green Township. Aajeedh Khalique was crowned the winner of Airtel Super Singer Junior Season 3. Pragathy Guruprasad was the first runner up. 

Ananth Vaidyanathan returned as a permanent voice trainer, and playback singers K. S. Chithra, Mano, and Malgudi Subha returned as permanent judges during the main competition rounds of the show. A number of eminent playback singers and music directors appeared during the season as guest judges, including P. B. Sreenivas, M. S. Viswanathan, P. Susheela, S. Janaki, Sadhana Sargam, Nithyasree Mahadevan, Sudha Raghunathan, Sowmya, Aruna Sairam, Pushpavanam Kuppuswamy, Rajkumar Bharathi, and Bombay Sisters. Stars from the senior version of the show also appeared as judges during the season, including former contestants, and permanent judge P. Unnikrishnan.

Launch week (season 3) 
The grand opening week was hosted by actresses and television anchors, Kalyani and Ramya. Judges throughout launch week were Manikka Vinayagam, S. P. Sailaja, Pushpavanam Kuppuswamy, and Mahathi.

Auditions (season 3) 
Auditions took place in Chennai, Coimbatore, and Trichy.

Open auditions in Tamil Nadu
Open auditions were held across Tamil Nadu.

The ground level auditions in Trichy and Coimbatore were judged by former contestants of Airtel Super Singer 2, being Ajeesh, Prasanna, Srinivas and Ragini.

The ground level auditions in Chennai were judged by former winners and finalists from each season of the senior version of the show, Airtel Super Singer, including Nikhil Mathew and Anitha from season 1, Ajeesh, Raginisri, and Prasanna, from season 2, as well as Saicharan, Santhosh Hariharan, Sathyaprakash, Pooja, and Malavika from season 3.

Main level auditions
All main level auditions were held in Chennai.

Finalists 
Aajeedh Khalique (winner)

Finals

Main Competition Performance Rounds

Introduction Round (28 November 2011 – 2 December 2011)
 Hosts: Kalyani and Makapa Anand
 Special Guest Audition Judges: Nithyasree Mahadevan, S. P. Sailaja, and Pushpavanam Kuppuswamy
 Permanent Judges: Malgudi Subha, Mano, and K. S. Chithra
 Permanent voice trainer: Ananth Vaidyanathan
 Performances:

Special guest audition judges appeared on the show to introduce the 30 selected finalists, while the permanent judges returned to greet the selected contestants for the first time.

Fast Songs Round (5 December 2011 – 9 December 2011)
 Hosts: Kalyani and Ramya
 Permanent Judges: K. S. Chithra, Mano, and Malgudi Subha
 Permanent voice trainer: Ananth Vaidyanathan
 Performances:

Episodes 36 to 40.

Rajini Hits Round (12 December 2011 – 16 December 2011)
 Hosts: Kalyani and Makapa Anand
 Permanent Judges: K. S. Chithra, Mano, and Malgudi Subha
 Permanent voice trainer: Ananth Vaidyanathan
 Performances:

Episodes 41 to 45.

Koothu Songs Round (19 December 2011 – 23 December 2011)
 Hosts: Kalyani and Makapa Anand
 Special Guest Judge: Pushpavanam Kuppuswamy
 Permanent Judges: K. S. Chithra and Malgudi Subha
 Permanent voice trainer: Ananth Vaidyanathan
 Performances:

Episodes 46 to 50.

Christmas and New Year Special: Western Songs Round (26 December 2011 – 30 December 2011)
 Hosts: Sivakarthikeyan and Makapa Anand
 Permanent Judges: K. S. Chithra, Mano, and Malgudi Subha
 Permanent voice trainer & Santa: Ananth Vaidyanathan
 Performances:

Episodes 51 to 55.

Hits Of 2011 Round (2 January 2012 – 6 January 2012)
 Hosts: Makapa Anand and Bhavana
 Permanent Judges: Mano and Malgudi Subha
 Permanent voice trainer & Santa: Ananth Vaidyanathan
 Performances:

Episodes 56 to 60.

Folk Songs Round (9 January 2012 – 13 January 2012)
 Hosts: Makapa Anand and Bhavana
 Permanent Judges: Mano and Malgudi Subha
 Permanent voice trainer: Ananth Vaidyanathan
 Performances:

Episodes 61 to 65.

Rain Songs Round (16 January 2012 – 20 January 2012)
 Hosts: Makapa Anand and Bhavana
 Permanent Judges: Mano and Malgudi Subha
 Permanent voice trainer: Ananth Vaidyanathan
 Performances:

Episodes 66 to 70.

Other Language Songs Round (23 January 2012 – 27 January 2012)
 Hosts: Makapa Anand and Bhavana
 Permanent Judges: Mano, K. S. Chitra, and Malgudi Subha
 Permanent voice trainer: Ananth Vaidyanathan
 Performances:

Episodes 71 to 75.

Semi-Classical Round (30 January 2012 – 3 February 2012)
 Hosts: Makapa Anand and Bhavana
 Permanent Judges: Mano, K. S. Chitra, and Malgudi Subha
 Permanent voice trainer: Ananth Vaidyanathan
 Performances:

Episodes 76 to 80.

Nenjil Nindra Raagangal Round (6 February 2012 – 10 February 2012)
 Hosts: Makapa Anand and Bhavana
 Permanent Judges: Mano, K. S. Chitra, and Malgudi Subha
 Permanent voice trainer: Ananth Vaidyanathan
 Performances:

Episodes 81 to 85.

Valentine's Week: Dedication Round (13 February 2012 – 17 January 2012)
 Hosts: Makapa Anand and Bhavana
 Permanent Judges: Mano, K. S. Chitra, and Malgudi Subha
 Permanent voice trainer: Ananth Vaidyanathan
 Performances:

Episodes 86 to 90.

Classical Round (20 August 2012 – 24 August 2012)
 Hosts: Makapa Anand and Bhavana
 Special Guest Performance by: special guest judge Nithyasree Mahadevan (vocal) and actress Sukanya (dance)
 Special Guest Judges: Bombay Sisters, Rajkumar Bharathi, Sudha Raghunathan, Aruna Sairam, and Nithyasree Mahadevan
 Special Guest Instrumentalists: Rajhesh Vaidhya (veena), Umashankar (ghatam), K.L. Vijay (flute), Ramakrishnan (mridangam), Madhu (tabla), Chitti Prakash (vibraphone), and Biju (keyboard)
 Permanent Judge: P. Unnikrishnan
 Permanent voice trainer: Ananth Vaidyanathan
 Performances:

 – Non-competition performance 
 – Highlight performance

This round required the top 7 contestants to sing songs which fitted in the Carnatic music ("classical") genre. This week's orchestra accompanying the contestants consisted of 7 special guest performers (instrumentalists). The best Carnatic singer title of the season was also promised to the best performing contestant of the week.

At the conclusion of this week's performances, the 7 special guest judges decided not to eliminate any contestant based on this week's performances. Consequently, the scores would be carried over to the next week, and a decision would then be made as to which contestant would be eliminated.

Live Grand Finale (26 October 2012)

Grand Final Results (season 3)

References 

2012 Tamil-language television seasons
Star Vijay original programming